Cubophis ruttyi, the  Little Cayman racer, is a species of snake in the family Colubridae. The species is native to Little Cayman Island.

References

Cubophis
Snakes of North America
Reptiles described in 1941
Taxa named by Chapman Grant